Dustin Edge (born December 9, 1977) is an American singer-songwriter and musician.

Discography 
 A Forest Through the Trees (2008)
 By the Numbers (2010)
 Calm (2011)
 Data Plus (2014)
 Equalism (2014)
 For (2014)
 Guest of Nature (2018)

External links 
 

Living people
1977 births
American male singer-songwriters
Musicians from Louisville, Kentucky
Singer-songwriters from Kentucky
21st-century American singers
21st-century American male singers